Takuu, formerly known as Tauu and also known as Takuu Mortlock or Marqueen Islands, is a small, isolated atoll off the east coast of Bougainville in Papua New Guinea.

Geography
Takuu lies about 250 km to the northeast of Kieta, a city on the east coast of Bougainville. The atoll consists of about 13 islands to the east and one island to the northwest. Takuu Island is the southernmost and largest of the islands on the eastern side of the atoll. Most of the population, however, lives on the small neighbouring island of Nukutoa.

The islands in the atoll are very low-lying, about a metre above the high tide mark. Local rise in sea level has been noticed by the people of Takuu and by Richard Moyle, a University of Auckland ethnomusicologist who studied the atoll for 17 years. It is, however, much lower than the publicised 20 centimetres a year. Two scientists (Scott Smithers and John Hunter) who visited the atoll in November and December 2008 say it does not appear to be sinking due to tectonic activity.

While the atoll is likely to persist physically for some time, a variety of problems due to apparent climate-change related phenomena and the political situation are making life on Takuu very difficult.  Moyle has predicted that climate change will eventually extinguish the atoll's ability to sustain life. "Takuu families living elsewhere in Papua New Guinea will take in as many as they can, but with no single resettlement location, I can't see Takuu continuing to function as a community" (Moyle, quoted in Wane 2005:10).

Population and culture
The islands are inhabited by approximately 400 people of Polynesian origin. Takuu is one of the Polynesian outlier cultures which are situated outside of the Polynesian Triangle. The people of Takuu have traditionally placed great value on the retention of their indigenous practices and religious sites. To protect Takuu from outside influences, the Ariki (chief) banned Christian missionaries for the last 25 years.  Only four researchers have been permitted to spend time on the islands in that time. The ban was only lifted in the last five years, as young islanders who had lived and studied on the Papua New Guinea mainland returned to their homeland.  A number of churches have now been established on Nukutoa.

Since 2006 a team of filmmakers (principally Briar March and Lyn Collie) have visited the atoll twice, making a documentary that records culture and life on the atoll, and examines the possibility that the community might have to relocate to the Bougainville mainland if their physical situation worsens.  The second shoot in 2008 included the visit of scientists Scott Smithers and John Hunter.

Traditional life continues to this day on Takuu. Traditional thatched houses stand in crowded rows, so close to each other that the eaves almost touch. There are few trees on the island apart from coconut palms, and the main street serves as a marae, a space for ritual ceremonies. Music is still a fundamental part of life on Takuu. Because of the long period of isolation, many of the indigenous songs, stories and dances have survived. Many of the songs date from the period before European contact, which occurred in the mid 19th century. The songs tell stories of voyages between the islands, while "dance performances fill 20 or 30 hours a week" (Wane 2005). Many of the songs are celebrations of successful relationships, whether relationships that link extended families together in productive activity or relationships binding people with their ancestors in times of need.

Language
The people of Takuu speak a Polynesian language. Recent classifications of the Polynesian languages place the Takuu language in an Ellicean branch, along with Nukuoro, Kapingamarangi, Nukuria, Nukumanu, Luangiua, and Sikaiana. Twentieth-century classifications had placed these languages in a Samoic Outlier group.

Economy
The local economy depends on agriculture and fishing. In recent years, the cultivation of food plants has grown steadily more difficult as the fresh water table becomes contaminated by sea water. Some of the traditional taro gardens have salt water flowing into them at high tide, which kills the crop.  As a result, the returns from cultivation are diminishing and the people have been forced to appeal to the Papua New Guinea and Bougainville Regional governments for assistance.  In 2001, the community faced a time of great deprivation and hunger when the supply ship that regularly visits the islands was laid up for six months for repairs - and this is not unusual.

In early 2006 a cyclone devastated the islands and added to their already compromised situation.  In December 2008, a series of tidal surges at high tide over three days washed away kitchens, flooded homes and destroyed a number of churches, terrifying the people.  The service boat was unable to come for several weeks afterwards, emphasising the vulnerability of the atoll community.  It appears that some of the community are now looking to relocate permanently to the Bougainville mainland.

The population dropped rapidly from around 2010 with the end of regular shipping, and expatriate Takuu chartered open boats to bring off family members, most of whom settled in Buka. In 2019 the estimated resident population was 150.

References

Joanna Wane, 2005. 'Before the Flood'. Ingenio et Labore: Magazine of the University of Auckland, Spring 2005, 10–12. Accessed 19 May 2009.
Herb Kawainui Kāne, Evolution of the Hawaiian Canoe,1998.http://pvs.kcc.hawaii.edu/ike/kalai_waa/kane_evolution_hawaiian_canoe.html. Accessed 17 January 2011.

External links
Before the flood Ingenio magazine, University of Auckland (pdf file)  
Mortlock Islands The two distinct island groups named "Mortlock Islands"  
Locals face starvation as their Island home sinks  CNN.com/World
Musical Memory of Takuu Royal Society of New Zealand, Marsden Fund Newsletter
PNG island sinking World today archives, ABC Online (Australia)
Takuu Islands Association An associated dedicated to saving the islands
Takuu's tragedy unfolding Islands Business
There once was an Island
  

Islands of Papua New Guinea
Geography of the Autonomous Region of Bougainville
Polynesian outliers
Volcanoes of Bougainville Island